Finswimming at the 2011 Southeast Asian Games was held at the Jakabaring Sport Complex  in Palembang, Indonesia from 19  to 21 November 2011.

Medal summary

Men

Women

Medal table

References

External links
  2011 Southeast Asian Games

2011 Southeast Asian Games events
Finswimming at multi-sport events